Anolis kahouannensis the  Kahouanne anole, is a species of lizard in the family Dactyloidae. The species is found in Guadeloupe.

References

Anoles
Reptiles described in 1964
Endemic fauna of Guadeloupe
Reptiles of Guadeloupe